Aimal Wali Khan (born 18 November 1986) is a Pakistani politician and the provincial president of the Awami National Party (ANP) for Khyber Pakhtunkhwa, Pakistan. He is the son of the central president of ANP, Asfandyar Wali Khan; the grandson of the founder of ANP, Abdul Wali Khan; and the great-grandson of the founder of the Khudai Khidmatgar movement, Abdul Ghaffar Khan.

Education
Khan completed his early education at Fazl-e-Haq school and College Mardan and his A-levels at Atchison College Lahore. He also earned a Master of Business Administration.

Political career
Khan started his political career in 2007 as a worker for the Pakhtun Students’ Federation (PSF). He remained associated with the student wing till 2011. Awami National Party holds their intraparty elections every four years. Khan was elected as Joint Secretary in 2011, Afrasiab Khattak was leading the provincial cabinet at that moment. In 2014, Khan was elected as Provincial Deputy General Secretary for four years. He also served as an acting General Secretary of Khyber Pakhtunkhwa. In 2019, his name was suggested for the Provincial President and no one opposed him. His name was suggested by the then Provincial President and Ex-Chief Minister Khyber Pakhtunkhwa Amir Haider Khan Hoti. He was elected as Provincial President ANP Khyber Pakhtunkhwa on 12 April 2019. Khan also holds the Directorship of Baacha Khan Trust. 

He ran for the seat of the Provincial Assembly of Khyber Pakhtunkhwa from Constituency PK-58 (Charsadda-II) as a candidate of ANP in the 2018 Khyber Pakhtunkhwa provincial election but was unsuccessful. He received 22,141 votes and lost the seat to Sultan Muhammad Khan, a candidate of Pakistan Tehreek-e-Insaf (PTI).

He ran for the seat of the National Assembly from Constituency NA-24 (Charsadda-II) as a candidate of ANP in the 2022 Pakistan by-elections but was unsuccessful. He received 68,356 votes and lost the seat to Imran Khan, the chairman of PTI.

Khan also writes articles in Pakistani newspapers addressing political issues of the country. He is critical of extremism and terrorism in Pakistan.

References

External links 
 

Living people
Awami National Party politicians
1986 births
Pashtun people
People from Charsadda District, Pakistan
Iqra University alumni
Aitchison College alumni
Institute of Business Administration, Karachi alumni